José Enrique Peña Peña (born 10 September 1968) is a Bolivian football manager and former player who played as a midfielder. He is the current manager of Universitario de Vinto.

Playing career
Born in Santa Cruz de la Sierra, Peña represented Real Santa Cruz (two stints), Universitario de Sucre, Ciclón, Always Ready, The Strongest (two stints), San José, Destroyers, Oriente Petrolero (two stints), Real Potosí, Millonarios, Bolívar and Independiente Petrolero. He retired with Oriente in 2004, aged 36.

Managerial career
After retiring, Peña started his managerial career with Bancruz in 2008. He won the 2009 Copa Simón Bolívar with Guabirá, and was in charge of Ciclón for a brief period in the following year, taking over the club in June and resigning in August.

In January 2021, Peña was named in charge of Real Santa Cruz, and missed out promotion in the final stages of the 2012–13 Liga Nacional B. In 2014, he was a part of his brother's staff at San José, and both later started a football school in their hometown.

Peña returned to managerial duties in 2017, taking over another club he represented as a player, Destroyers. He was sacked on 13 August 2018, and returned to Real Santa Cruz in 2019.

On 31 August 2022, Peña was announced at Deportivo FATIC. The following 14 March, he returned to the top tier after being named in charge of newcomers Libertad Gran Mamoré.

Personal life
Peña's older brother Álvaro was also a footballer and is also a manager. He represented Bolivia in the 1994 FIFA World Cup.

Honours

Manager
Guabirá
Copa Simón Bolívar: 2009

References

External links

1968 births
Living people
Sportspeople from Santa Cruz de la Sierra
Bolivian footballers
Association football midfielders
Real Santa Cruz players
Universitario de Sucre footballers
Club Atlético Ciclón players
Club Always Ready players
The Strongest players
Club San José players
Club Destroyers players
Oriente Petrolero players
Club Real Potosí players
Millonarios F.C. players
Club Bolívar players
Club Independiente Petrolero players
Bolivian football managers
Club Deportivo Guabirá managers
Real Santa Cruz managers
Club Destroyers managers
Libertad Gran Mamoré F.C. managers